The 1927 Hamilton municipal election was held on December 5, 1927 to select one Mayor, one Hydro Commissioner, four Controllers, and sixteen members of the Hamilton, Ontario, City Council, two from each of the city's eight wards. Voters also cast ballots for trustees for the public school board, and in two bylaw referendum questions regarding an expansion to Hamilton's General Hospital and the city's sewer system.

Campaign

Mayor

The 1927 Mayoral contest in Hamilton saw the retirement of sitting two-term mayor Freeman Treleaven. On Nomination Day, Treleaven was nominated for a third term by two of his supporters, George Wild and T.H. Simpson. Speaking at city hall, Treleaven indicated he felt his two terms in office had been successful and expressed discomfort at potentially being elected to a third term, as only three other mayors in the city's history up to that point had served more than two terms in office.

With Treleaven declining to seek office, the race for the mayoralty became a two-candidate contest between sitting Controller Calvin Davis and former Controller William Burton. Prior to his nomination for the office of mayor, Burton had been considered a contender for the Hydro Commissioner's seat until November 21, when the Hamilton Spectator confirmed through a campaign supporter that the former Controller's political ambitions had shifted Burton's campaign was affiliated with the local Conservative Party establishment, despite assertions that partisan politics did not play a role in local government. Burton's campaign focused on lower taxes as an incentive to business, keeping municipal spending low, and improving local business façades to present a better local image.

Davis' campaign began much earlier, with speculation of his mayoral ambitions appearing in the Spectator on November 2. At the time of his candidacy, Davis was the dean of Hamilton City Council, having been elected as Ward 1 Councillor in 1918 and moving to the Board of Control the following year, which was a record for continuous service on council. Davis' campaign focused on continuing outgoing mayor Treleaven's work and highlighted the close working relationship between the two.

Despite providing various levels of support to candidates in the past, the city's largest newspaper, the Spectator, opted to not endorse either candidate, rather encouraging electors to consider each candidate's administrative abilities and personal political history.

On Election Day, despite campaigning for a single week, Burton secured a commanding majority, winning every ward in the city.

|-
!rowspan="2" colspan="2"|Candidate
!rowspan="2" colspan="1"|Affiliation
!colspan="2"|Popular vote
!rowspan="2"| Elected?
|-
! Votes
! %
|-

| style="text-align:left;" | William Burton
| style="text-align:right;" | Independent Conservative
| style="text-align:right;" |15,052
| style="text-align:right;" |64.24%
| style="text-align:center;" |
|-

| style="text-align:left;" | Calvin Davis
| style="text-align:right;" | Independent Liberal
| style="text-align:right;" |8,382
| style="text-align:right;" |35.76%
| style="text-align:center;" |
|-
| style="text-align:right;background-color:#FFFFFF;" colspan="3" |Total votes
| style="text-align:right;background-color:#FFFFFF;" colspan="1" |23,432
| style="text-align:right;background-color:#FFFFFF;" colspan="2" |
|- 
| style="text-align:right;background-color:#FFFFFF;" colspan="3" |Registered voters
| style="text-align:right;background-color:#FFFFFF;" |
| style="text-align:right;background-color:#FFFFFF;" colspan="1" |
| style="text-align:left;background-color:#FFFFFF;" colspan="1" |
|- 
| style="text-align:left;" colspan="6" |Note: Candidate campaign colours are used as a visual differentiation between candidates and to indicate affiliation.
|- 
| style="text-align:left;" colspan="13" |Sources: "Burton for Mayor; Demand of the People, Hamilton Spectator, December 6, 1927, 5,11."Herald Results as Victory for Party," Hamilton Spectator, December 6, 1927, 5,23.
|}

Hydro Commissioner

|-
!rowspan="2" colspan="2"|Candidate
!rowspan="2" colspan="1"|Affiliation
!colspan="2"|Popular vote
!rowspan="2"| Elected?
|-
! Votes
! %
|-

| style="text-align:left;" | Willoughby Ellis
| style="text-align:right;" | Independent
| style="text-align:right;" |11,960
| style="text-align:right;" |54.08%
| style="text-align:center;" |
|-

| style="text-align:left;" | George Henry Evoy
| style="text-align:right;" | Independent
| style="text-align:right;" |10,157
| style="text-align:right;" |45.92%
| style="text-align:center;" |
|-
| style="text-align:right;background-color:#FFFFFF;" colspan="3" |Total votes
| style="text-align:right;background-color:#FFFFFF;" colspan="1" |22,117
| style="text-align:right;background-color:#FFFFFF;" colspan="2" |
|- 
| style="text-align:right;background-color:#FFFFFF;" colspan="3" |Registered voters
| style="text-align:right;background-color:#FFFFFF;" |
| style="text-align:right;background-color:#FFFFFF;" colspan="1" |
| style="text-align:left;background-color:#FFFFFF;" colspan="1" |
|- 
| style="text-align:left;" colspan="6" |Note: Candidate campaign colours are used as a visual differentiation between candidates and to indicate affiliation.
|- 
| style="text-align:left;" colspan="13" |Sources: "Burton for Mayor; Demand of the People, Hamilton Spectator, December 6, 1927, 5,11.
|}

Board of Control

|-
!rowspan="2" colspan="2"|Candidate
!rowspan="2" colspan="1"|Affiliation
!colspan="2"|Popular vote
!rowspan="2"| Elected?
|-
! Votes
! %
|-

| style="text-align:left;" | John Peebles (incumbent)
| style="text-align:right;" | Independent Liberal
| style="text-align:right;" |12,926
| style="text-align:right;" |
| style="text-align:center;" |
|-

| style="text-align:left;" | William Morrison (incumbent)
| style="text-align:right;" | Independent Conservative
| style="text-align:right;" |11,535
| style="text-align:right;" |
| style="text-align:center;" |
|-

| style="text-align:left;" | John Henry Bell (incumbent)
| style="text-align:right;" | Independent Conservative
| style="text-align:right;" |11,248
| style="text-align:right;" |
| style="text-align:center;" |
|-

| style="text-align:left;" | Herbert Arthur Burrell
| style="text-align:right;" | Independent Conservative
| style="text-align:right;" |9,896
| style="text-align:right;" |
| style="text-align:center;" |
|-

| style="text-align:left;" | John George Sherring
| style="text-align:right;" | Independent
| style="text-align:right;" |9,048
| style="text-align:right;" |
| style="text-align:center;" |
|-

| style="text-align:left;" | C. Herbert MacKay
| style="text-align:right;" | Independent
| style="text-align:right;" |8,395
| style="text-align:right;" |
| style="text-align:center;" |
|-
| style="text-align:right;background-color:#FFFFFF;" colspan="3" |Total votes
| style="text-align:right;background-color:#FFFFFF;" colspan="1" |
| style="text-align:right;background-color:#FFFFFF;" colspan="2" |
|- 
| style="text-align:right;background-color:#FFFFFF;" colspan="3" |Registered voters
| style="text-align:right;background-color:#FFFFFF;" |
| style="text-align:right;background-color:#FFFFFF;" colspan="1" |
| style="text-align:left;background-color:#FFFFFF;" colspan="1" |
|- 
| style="text-align:left;" colspan="6" |Note: Candidate campaign colours are used as a visual differentiation between candidates and to indicate affiliation.
|- 
| style="text-align:left;" colspan="13" |Sources: "Burton for Mayor; Demand of the People, Hamilton Spectator, December 6, 1927, 5,11."Herald Results as Victory for Party," Hamilton Spectator, December 6, 1927, 5,23.
|}

Referendums

|- style="text-align:center;background:#E9E9E9;"
! colspan="5" | Hamilton, Ontario Municipal Election1927 Bylaw Referendums
|- style="text-align:center;background:#E9E9E9;"
! rowspan="2" style="text-align:left;" | Question
! colspan="2" |  Yes
! colspan="2" | No
|- style="text-align:center;background:#E9E9E9;"
! Votes !! % !! Votes !! %
|-
| style="text-align:left;" | A by-law regarding an expansion to Hamilton's General Hospital  || 5,765 || 46.44 || 6,648 || 
|- 
| style="text-align:left;" | A by-law regarding improvements to Hamilton's storm sewer system || 6,262 ||  || 5,411 || 46.35
|- 
| style="text-align:right;background-color:#FFFFFF;" colspan="1" |Total votes
| style="text-align:right;background-color:#FFFFFF;" colspan="4" style="text-align:left;"|
|- 
| style="text-align:right;background-color:#FFFFFF;" colspan="1" |Registered voters
| style="text-align:right;background-color:#FFFFFF;" colspan="4" style="text-align:left;"|
|- 
| style="text-align:left;" colspan="13" |Sources: "Burton for Mayor; Demand of the People, Hamilton Spectator, December 6, 1927, 5,11.
|}

Aldermen

Ward One

|-
!rowspan="2" colspan="2"|Candidate
!rowspan="2" colspan="1"|Affiliation
!colspan="2"|Popular vote
!rowspan="2"| Elected?
|-
! Votes
! %
|-

| style="text-align:left;" | Herbert Wilton (incumbent)
| style="text-align:right;" | Independent Conservative
| style="text-align:right;" |1,904
| style="text-align:right;" |
| style="text-align:center;" |
|-

| style="text-align:left;" | Alastan Polson 
| style="text-align:right;" | Independent Conservative
| style="text-align:right;" |1,871
| style="text-align:right;" |
| style="text-align:center;" |
|-

| style="text-align:left;" | Richard Evan Jones (incumbent)
| style="text-align:right;" | Independent
| style="text-align:right;" |1,590
| style="text-align:right;" |
| style="text-align:center;" |
|-

| style="text-align:left;" | Robert Currie Gardner
| style="text-align:right;" | Independent
| style="text-align:right;" |1,509
| style="text-align:right;" |
| style="text-align:center;" |
|-
| style="text-align:right;background-color:#FFFFFF;" colspan="3" |Total votes
| style="text-align:right;background-color:#FFFFFF;" colspan="1" |
| style="text-align:right;background-color:#FFFFFF;" colspan="2" |
|- 
| style="text-align:right;background-color:#FFFFFF;" colspan="3" |Registered voters
| style="text-align:right;background-color:#FFFFFF;" |
| style="text-align:right;background-color:#FFFFFF;" colspan="1" |
| style="text-align:left;background-color:#FFFFFF;" colspan="1" |
|- 
| style="text-align:left;" colspan="6" |Note: Candidate campaign colours are used as a visual differentiation between candidates and to indicate affiliation.
|- 
| style="text-align:left;" colspan="13" |Sources: "Aldermanic Vote", Hamilton Spectator, December 6, 1927, 11."Herald Results as Victory for Party," Hamilton Spectator, December 6, 1927, 5,23.
|}

Ward Two

|-
!rowspan="2" colspan="2"|Candidate
!rowspan="2" colspan="1"|Affiliation
!colspan="2"|Popular vote
!rowspan="2"| Elected?
|-
! Votes
! %
|-

| style="text-align:left;" | Gordon Flett 
| style="text-align:right;" | Independent Conservative
| style="text-align:right;" |1,451
| style="text-align:right;" |
| style="text-align:center;" |
|-

| style="text-align:left;" | Thomas Wright (incumbent)
| style="text-align:right;" | Independent Conservative
| style="text-align:right;" |1,245
| style="text-align:right;" |
| style="text-align:center;" |
|-

| style="text-align:left;" | Robert Spera (incumbent)
| style="text-align:right;" | Independent
| style="text-align:right;" |1,009
| style="text-align:right;" |
| style="text-align:center;" |
|-

| style="text-align:left;" | Henry Lloyd George Westland
| style="text-align:right;" | Independent Conservative
| style="text-align:right;" |888
| style="text-align:right;" |
| style="text-align:center;" |
|-
| style="text-align:right;background-color:#FFFFFF;" colspan="3" |Total votes
| style="text-align:right;background-color:#FFFFFF;" colspan="1" |
| style="text-align:right;background-color:#FFFFFF;" colspan="2" |
|- 
| style="text-align:right;background-color:#FFFFFF;" colspan="3" |Registered voters
| style="text-align:right;background-color:#FFFFFF;" |
| style="text-align:right;background-color:#FFFFFF;" colspan="1" |
| style="text-align:left;background-color:#FFFFFF;" colspan="1" |
|- 
| style="text-align:left;" colspan="6" |Note: Candidate campaign colours are used as a visual differentiation between candidates and to indicate affiliation.
|- 
| style="text-align:left;" colspan="13" |Sources: "Aldermanic Vote", Hamilton Spectator, December 6, 1927, 11."Herald Results as Victory for Party," Hamilton Spectator, December 6, 1927, 5,23.
|}

Ward Three

|-
!rowspan="2" colspan="2"|Candidate
!rowspan="2" colspan="1"|Affiliation
!colspan="2"|Popular vote
!rowspan="2"| Elected?
|-
! Votes
! %
|-

| style="text-align:left;" | Argue Martin (incumbent)
| style="text-align:right;" | Independent Conservative
!colspan="2" style="text-align:right;" |Acclaimed
| style="text-align:center;" |
|-

| style="text-align:left;" | Cranmer Riselay (incumbent)
| style="text-align:right;" | Independent Conservative
!colspan="2" style="text-align:right;" |Acclaimed
| style="text-align:center;" |
|-
| style="text-align:right;background-color:#FFFFFF;" colspan="3" |Total votes
| style="text-align:right;background-color:#FFFFFF;" colspan="1" |
| style="text-align:right;background-color:#FFFFFF;" colspan="2" |
|- 
| style="text-align:right;background-color:#FFFFFF;" colspan="3" |Registered voters
| style="text-align:right;background-color:#FFFFFF;" |
| style="text-align:right;background-color:#FFFFFF;" colspan="1" |
| style="text-align:left;background-color:#FFFFFF;" colspan="1" |
|- 
| style="text-align:left;" colspan="6" |Note: Candidate campaign colours are used as a visual differentiation between candidates and to indicate affiliation.
|- 
| style="text-align:left;" colspan="13" |Sources: "Aldermanic Vote", Hamilton Spectator, December 6, 1927, 11."Herald Results as Victory for Party," Hamilton Spectator, December 6, 1927, 5,23.
|}

Ward Four

|-
!rowspan="2" colspan="2"|Candidate
!rowspan="2" colspan="1"|Affiliation
!colspan="2"|Popular vote
!rowspan="2"| Elected?
|-
! Votes
! %
|-

| style="text-align:left;" | Donald McFarlane (incumbent)
| style="text-align:right;" | Independent Conservative
| style="text-align:right;" |1,513
| style="text-align:right;" |
| style="text-align:center;" |
|-

| style="text-align:left;" | Thomas O'Heir 
| style="text-align:right;" | Independent Conservative
| style="text-align:right;" |666
| style="text-align:right;" |
| style="text-align:center;" |
|-

| style="text-align:left;" | William Ronald (incumbent)
| style="text-align:right;" | Independent
| style="text-align:right;" |624
| style="text-align:right;" |
| style="text-align:center;" |
|-

| style="text-align:left;" | William Thompson
| style="text-align:right;" | Independent
| style="text-align:right;" |524
| style="text-align:right;" |
| style="text-align:center;" |
|-

| style="text-align:left;" | Edward Hughes
| style="text-align:right;" |Independent
| style="text-align:right;" |409
| style="text-align:right;" |
| style="text-align:center;" |
|-

| style="text-align:left;" | Percy Wright
| style="text-align:right;" | Independent
| style="text-align:right;" |371
| style="text-align:right;" |
| style="text-align:center;" |
|-

| style="text-align:left;" | Henry Roberts
| style="text-align:right;" | Canadian Labour Party
| style="text-align:right;" |149
| style="text-align:right;" |
| style="text-align:center;" |
|-
| style="text-align:right;background-color:#FFFFFF;" colspan="3" |Total votes
| style="text-align:right;background-color:#FFFFFF;" colspan="1" |
| style="text-align:right;background-color:#FFFFFF;" colspan="2" |
|- 
| style="text-align:right;background-color:#FFFFFF;" colspan="3" |Registered voters
| style="text-align:right;background-color:#FFFFFF;" |
| style="text-align:right;background-color:#FFFFFF;" colspan="1" |
| style="text-align:left;background-color:#FFFFFF;" colspan="1" |
|- 
| style="text-align:left;" colspan="6" |Note: Candidate campaign colours are used as a visual differentiation between candidates and to indicate affiliation.
|- 
| style="text-align:left;" colspan="13" |Sources: "Aldermanic Vote", Hamilton Spectator, December 6, 1927, 11."Herald Results as Victory for Party," Hamilton Spectator, December 6, 1927, 5,23.
|}

Ward Five

|-
!rowspan="2" colspan="2"|Candidate
!rowspan="2" colspan="1"|Affiliation
!colspan="2"|Popular vote
!rowspan="2"| Elected?
|-
! Votes
! %
|-

| style="text-align:left;" | Charles Aitchison (incumbent)
| style="text-align:right;" | Canadian Labour Party
| style="text-align:right;" |1,368
| style="text-align:right;" |
| style="text-align:center;" |
|-

| style="text-align:left;" | Albert Marck 
| style="text-align:right;" | Independent Conservative
| style="text-align:right;" |1,309
| style="text-align:right;" |
| style="text-align:center;" |
|-

| style="text-align:left;" | George Halcrow
| style="text-align:right;" | Independent
| style="text-align:right;" |1,139
| style="text-align:right;" |
| style="text-align:center;" |
|-
| style="text-align:right;background-color:#FFFFFF;" colspan="3" |Total votes
| style="text-align:right;background-color:#FFFFFF;" colspan="1" |
| style="text-align:right;background-color:#FFFFFF;" colspan="2" |
|- 
| style="text-align:right;background-color:#FFFFFF;" colspan="3" |Registered voters
| style="text-align:right;background-color:#FFFFFF;" |
| style="text-align:right;background-color:#FFFFFF;" colspan="1" |
| style="text-align:left;background-color:#FFFFFF;" colspan="1" |
|- 
| style="text-align:left;" colspan="6" |Note: Candidate campaign colours are used as a visual differentiation between candidates and to indicate affiliation.
|- 
| style="text-align:left;" colspan="13" |Sources: "Aldermanic Vote", Hamilton Spectator, December 6, 1927, 11."Herald Results as Victory for Party," Hamilton Spectator, December 6, 1927, 5,23.
|}

Ward Six

|-
!rowspan="2" colspan="2"|Candidate
!rowspan="2" colspan="1"|Affiliation
!colspan="2"|Popular vote
!rowspan="2"| Elected?
|-
! Votes
! %
|-

| style="text-align:left;" | John Hodgson (incumbent)
| style="text-align:right;" | Independent Conservative
| style="text-align:right;" |1,834
| style="text-align:right;" |
| style="text-align:center;" |
|-

| style="text-align:left;" | Fred Brooks 
| style="text-align:right;" | Independent Conservative
| style="text-align:right;" |1,564
| style="text-align:right;" |
| style="text-align:center;" |
|-

| style="text-align:left;" | Archie Pollock
| style="text-align:right;" | Canadian Labour Party
| style="text-align:right;" |864
| style="text-align:right;" |
| style="text-align:center;" |
|-
| style="text-align:right;background-color:#FFFFFF;" colspan="3" |Total votes
| style="text-align:right;background-color:#FFFFFF;" colspan="1" |
| style="text-align:right;background-color:#FFFFFF;" colspan="2" |
|- 
| style="text-align:right;background-color:#FFFFFF;" colspan="3" |Registered voters
| style="text-align:right;background-color:#FFFFFF;" |
| style="text-align:right;background-color:#FFFFFF;" colspan="1" |
| style="text-align:left;background-color:#FFFFFF;" colspan="1" |
|- 
| style="text-align:left;" colspan="6" |Note: Candidate campaign colours are used as a visual differentiation between candidates and to indicate affiliation.
|- 
| style="text-align:left;" colspan="13" |Sources: "Aldermanic Vote", Hamilton Spectator, December 6, 1927, 11."Herald Results as Victory for Party," Hamilton Spectator, December 6, 1927, 5,23.
|}

Ward Seven

|-
!rowspan="2" colspan="2"|Candidate
!rowspan="2" colspan="1"|Affiliation
!colspan="2"|Popular vote
!rowspan="2"| Elected?
|-
! Votes
! %
|-

| style="text-align:left;" | Archie Burton (incumbent)
| style="text-align:right;" | Independent Conservative
| style="text-align:right;" |2,222
| style="text-align:right;" |
| style="text-align:center;" |
|-

| style="text-align:left;" | Charles Brayley 
| style="text-align:right;" | Independent Conservative
| style="text-align:right;" |1,122
| style="text-align:right;" |
| style="text-align:center;" |
|-

| style="text-align:left;" | Samuel Clark
| style="text-align:right;" | Independent
| style="text-align:right;" |1,052
| style="text-align:right;" |
| style="text-align:center;" |
|-

| style="text-align:left;" | Stanley Marriner
| style="text-align:right;" | Canadian Labour Party
| style="text-align:right;" |299
| style="text-align:right;" |
| style="text-align:center;" |
|-
| style="text-align:right;background-color:#FFFFFF;" colspan="3" |Total votes
| style="text-align:right;background-color:#FFFFFF;" colspan="1" |
| style="text-align:right;background-color:#FFFFFF;" colspan="2" |
|- 
| style="text-align:right;background-color:#FFFFFF;" colspan="3" |Registered voters
| style="text-align:right;background-color:#FFFFFF;" |
| style="text-align:right;background-color:#FFFFFF;" colspan="1" |
| style="text-align:left;background-color:#FFFFFF;" colspan="1" |
|- 
| style="text-align:left;" colspan="6" |Note: Candidate campaign colours are used as a visual differentiation between candidates and to indicate affiliation.
|- 
| style="text-align:left;" colspan="13" |Sources: "Aldermanic Vote", Hamilton Spectator, December 6, 1927, 11."Herald Results as Victory for Party," Hamilton Spectator, December 6, 1927, 5,23.
|}

Ward Eight

|-
!rowspan="2" colspan="2"|Candidate
!rowspan="2" colspan="1"|Affiliation
!colspan="2"|Popular vote
!rowspan="2"| Elected?
|-
! Votes
! %
|-

| style="text-align:left;" | Sam Lawrence (incumbent)
| style="text-align:right;" | Canadian Labour Party
| style="text-align:right;" |2,222
| style="text-align:right;" |
| style="text-align:center;" |
|-

| style="text-align:left;" | Alfred Smees 
| style="text-align:right;" | Independent Conservative
| style="text-align:right;" |1,641
| style="text-align:right;" |
| style="text-align:center;" |
|-

| style="text-align:left;" | Thomas Lewington
| style="text-align:right;" | Independent
| style="text-align:right;" |1,571
| style="text-align:right;" |
| style="text-align:center;" |
|-

| style="text-align:left;" | Henry Dirks
| style="text-align:right;" | Independent
| style="text-align:right;" |434
| style="text-align:right;" |
| style="text-align:center;" |
|-

| style="text-align:left;" | George Jones
| style="text-align:right;" | Independent
| style="text-align:right;" |372
| style="text-align:right;" |
| style="text-align:center;" |
|-
| style="text-align:right;background-color:#FFFFFF;" colspan="3" |Total votes
| style="text-align:right;background-color:#FFFFFF;" colspan="1" |
| style="text-align:right;background-color:#FFFFFF;" colspan="2" |
|- 
| style="text-align:right;background-color:#FFFFFF;" colspan="3" |Registered voters
| style="text-align:right;background-color:#FFFFFF;" |
| style="text-align:right;background-color:#FFFFFF;" colspan="1" |
| style="text-align:left;background-color:#FFFFFF;" colspan="1" |
|- 
| style="text-align:left;" colspan="6" |Note: Candidate campaign colours are used as a visual differentiation between candidates and to indicate affiliation.
|- 
| style="text-align:left;" colspan="13" |Sources: "Aldermanic Vote", Hamilton Spectator, December 6, 1927, 11."Herald Results as Victory for Party," Hamilton Spectator, December 6, 1927, 5,23.
|}

Board of Education

Ward One

|-
!rowspan="2" colspan="2"|Candidate
!rowspan="2" colspan="1"|Affiliation
!colspan="2"|Popular vote
!rowspan="2"| Elected?
|-
! Votes
! %
|-

| style="text-align:left;" | John Pearson MacKay (incumbent)
| style="text-align:right;" | Independent
!colspan="2" style="text-align:right;" |Acclaimed
| style="text-align:center;" |
|-
| style="text-align:right;background-color:#FFFFFF;" colspan="3" |Total votes
| style="text-align:right;background-color:#FFFFFF;" colspan="1" |
| style="text-align:right;background-color:#FFFFFF;" colspan="2" |
|- 
| style="text-align:right;background-color:#FFFFFF;" colspan="3" |Registered voters
| style="text-align:right;background-color:#FFFFFF;" |
| style="text-align:right;background-color:#FFFFFF;" colspan="1" |
| style="text-align:left;background-color:#FFFFFF;" colspan="1" |
|- 
| style="text-align:left;" colspan="6" |Note: Candidate campaign colours are used as a visual differentiation between candidates and to indicate affiliation.
|- 
| style="text-align:left;" colspan="13" |Sources: "Nominations for School Trustee", Hamilton Spectator, November 28, 1927, 5.
|}

Ward Two

|-
!rowspan="2" colspan="2"|Candidate
!rowspan="2" colspan="1"|Affiliation
!colspan="2"|Popular vote
!rowspan="2"| Elected?
|-
! Votes
! %
|-

| style="text-align:left;" | Wallace William Lees (incumbent)
| style="text-align:right;" | Independent
!colspan="2" style="text-align:right;" |Acclaimed
| style="text-align:center;" |
|-
| style="text-align:right;background-color:#FFFFFF;" colspan="3" |Total votes
| style="text-align:right;background-color:#FFFFFF;" colspan="1" |
| style="text-align:right;background-color:#FFFFFF;" colspan="2" |
|- 
| style="text-align:right;background-color:#FFFFFF;" colspan="3" |Registered voters
| style="text-align:right;background-color:#FFFFFF;" |
| style="text-align:right;background-color:#FFFFFF;" colspan="1" |
| style="text-align:left;background-color:#FFFFFF;" colspan="1" |
|- 
| style="text-align:left;" colspan="6" |Note: Candidate campaign colours are used as a visual differentiation between candidates and to indicate affiliation.
|- 
| style="text-align:left;" colspan="13" |Sources: "Nominations for School Trustee", Hamilton Spectator, November 28, 1927, 5.
|}

Ward Three

|-
!rowspan="2" colspan="2"|Candidate
!rowspan="2" colspan="1"|Affiliation
!colspan="2"|Popular vote
!rowspan="2"| Elected?
|-
! Votes
! %
|-

| style="text-align:left;" | S.B. Russell (incumbent)
| style="text-align:right;" | Independent
!colspan="2" style="text-align:right;" |Acclaimed
| style="text-align:center;" |
|-
| style="text-align:right;background-color:#FFFFFF;" colspan="3" |Total votes
| style="text-align:right;background-color:#FFFFFF;" colspan="1" |
| style="text-align:right;background-color:#FFFFFF;" colspan="2" |
|- 
| style="text-align:right;background-color:#FFFFFF;" colspan="3" |Registered voters
| style="text-align:right;background-color:#FFFFFF;" |
| style="text-align:right;background-color:#FFFFFF;" colspan="1" |
| style="text-align:left;background-color:#FFFFFF;" colspan="1" |
|- 
| style="text-align:left;" colspan="6" |Note: Candidate campaign colours are used as a visual differentiation between candidates and to indicate affiliation.
|- 
| style="text-align:left;" colspan="13" |Sources: "Nominations for School Trustee", Hamilton Spectator, November 28, 1927, 5.
|}

Ward Four

|-
!rowspan="2" colspan="2"|Candidate
!rowspan="2" colspan="1"|Affiliation
!colspan="2"|Popular vote
!rowspan="2"| Elected?
|-
! Votes
! %
|-

| style="text-align:left;" | George R. Allan (incumbent)
| style="text-align:right;" | Independent Conservative
!colspan="2" style="text-align:right;" |Acclaimed
| style="text-align:center;" |
|-
| style="text-align:right;background-color:#FFFFFF;" colspan="3" |Total votes
| style="text-align:right;background-color:#FFFFFF;" colspan="1" |
| style="text-align:right;background-color:#FFFFFF;" colspan="2" |
|- 
| style="text-align:right;background-color:#FFFFFF;" colspan="3" |Registered voters
| style="text-align:right;background-color:#FFFFFF;" |
| style="text-align:right;background-color:#FFFFFF;" colspan="1" |
| style="text-align:left;background-color:#FFFFFF;" colspan="1" |
|- 
| style="text-align:left;" colspan="6" |Note: Candidate campaign colours are used as a visual differentiation between candidates and to indicate affiliation.
|- 
| style="text-align:left;" colspan="13" |Sources: "Nominations for School Trustee", Hamilton Spectator, November 28, 1927, 5.
|}

Ward Five

|-
!rowspan="2" colspan="2"|Candidate
!rowspan="2" colspan="1"|Affiliation
!colspan="2"|Popular vote
!rowspan="2"| Elected?
|-
! Votes
! %
|-

| style="text-align:left;" | Thomas McIlwraith (incumbent)
| style="text-align:right;" | Independent
!colspan="2" style="text-align:right;" |Acclaimed
| style="text-align:center;" |
|-
| style="text-align:right;background-color:#FFFFFF;" colspan="3" |Total votes
| style="text-align:right;background-color:#FFFFFF;" colspan="1" |
| style="text-align:right;background-color:#FFFFFF;" colspan="2" |
|- 
| style="text-align:right;background-color:#FFFFFF;" colspan="3" |Registered voters
| style="text-align:right;background-color:#FFFFFF;" |
| style="text-align:right;background-color:#FFFFFF;" colspan="1" |
| style="text-align:left;background-color:#FFFFFF;" colspan="1" |
|- 
| style="text-align:left;" colspan="6" |Note: Candidate campaign colours are used as a visual differentiation between candidates and to indicate affiliation.
|- 
| style="text-align:left;" colspan="13" |Sources: "Nominations for School Trustee", Hamilton Spectator, November 28, 1927, 5.
|}

Ward Six

|-
!rowspan="2" colspan="2"|Candidate
!rowspan="2" colspan="1"|Affiliation
!colspan="2"|Popular vote
!rowspan="2"| Elected?
|-
! Votes
! %
|-

| style="text-align:left;" | George Armstrong (incumbent)
| style="text-align:right;" | Independent
!colspan="2" style="text-align:right;" |Acclaimed
| style="text-align:center;" |
|-
| style="text-align:right;background-color:#FFFFFF;" colspan="3" |Total votes
| style="text-align:right;background-color:#FFFFFF;" colspan="1" |
| style="text-align:right;background-color:#FFFFFF;" colspan="2" |
|- 
| style="text-align:right;background-color:#FFFFFF;" colspan="3" |Registered voters
| style="text-align:right;background-color:#FFFFFF;" |
| style="text-align:right;background-color:#FFFFFF;" colspan="1" |
| style="text-align:left;background-color:#FFFFFF;" colspan="1" |
|- 
| style="text-align:left;" colspan="6" |Note: Candidate campaign colours are used as a visual differentiation between candidates and to indicate affiliation.
|- 
| style="text-align:left;" colspan="13" |Sources: "Nominations for School Trustee", Hamilton Spectator, November 28, 1927, 5.
|}

Ward Seven

|-
!rowspan="2" colspan="2"|Candidate
!rowspan="2" colspan="1"|Affiliation
!colspan="2"|Popular vote
!rowspan="2"| Elected?
|-
! Votes
! %
|-

| style="text-align:left;" | George Wild (incumbent)
| style="text-align:right;" | Independent Conservative
!colspan="2" style="text-align:right;" |Acclaimed
| style="text-align:center;" |
|-
| style="text-align:right;background-color:#FFFFFF;" colspan="3" |Total votes
| style="text-align:right;background-color:#FFFFFF;" colspan="1" |
| style="text-align:right;background-color:#FFFFFF;" colspan="2" |
|- 
| style="text-align:right;background-color:#FFFFFF;" colspan="3" |Registered voters
| style="text-align:right;background-color:#FFFFFF;" |
| style="text-align:right;background-color:#FFFFFF;" colspan="1" |
| style="text-align:left;background-color:#FFFFFF;" colspan="1" |
|- 
| style="text-align:left;" colspan="6" |Note: Candidate campaign colours are used as a visual differentiation between candidates and to indicate affiliation.
|- 
| style="text-align:left;" colspan="13" |Sources: "Nominations for School Trustee", Hamilton Spectator, November 28, 1927, 5.
|}

Ward Eight

|-
!rowspan="2" colspan="2"|Candidate
!rowspan="2" colspan="1"|Affiliation
!colspan="2"|Popular vote
!rowspan="2"| Elected?
|-
! Votes
! %
|-

| style="text-align:left;" | Harold Stanley Burns (incumbent)
| style="text-align:right;" | Independent
!colspan="2" style="text-align:right;" |Acclaimed
| style="text-align:center;" |
|-
| style="text-align:right;background-color:#FFFFFF;" colspan="3" |Total votes
| style="text-align:right;background-color:#FFFFFF;" colspan="1" |
| style="text-align:right;background-color:#FFFFFF;" colspan="2" |
|- 
| style="text-align:right;background-color:#FFFFFF;" colspan="3" |Registered voters
| style="text-align:right;background-color:#FFFFFF;" |
| style="text-align:right;background-color:#FFFFFF;" colspan="1" |
| style="text-align:left;background-color:#FFFFFF;" colspan="1" |
|- 
| style="text-align:left;" colspan="6" |Note: Candidate campaign colours are used as a visual differentiation between candidates and to indicate affiliation.
|- 
| style="text-align:left;" colspan="13" |Sources: "Nominations for School Trustee", Hamilton Spectator, November 28, 1927, 5.
|}

References

1927
1927 in Ontario
Hamilton